Agnieszka Jerzyk (born 15 January 1988) is a Polish triathlete. She competed in the Women's event at the 2012 Summer Olympics, finishing in 25th, and 22nd at the 2016 Summer Olympics.

References

External links
 

1988 births
Living people
Polish female triathletes
Olympic triathletes of Poland
Triathletes at the 2012 Summer Olympics
Triathletes at the 2016 Summer Olympics
People from Leszno
Sportspeople from Greater Poland Voivodeship
European Games competitors for Poland
Triathletes at the 2015 European Games
20th-century Polish women
21st-century Polish women